Incognito is the debut album by No Use for a Name. It was released on New Red Archives in 1990 and re-released on Fat Wreck Chords on October 23, 2001. It was produced by Brett Gurewitz of Bad Religion.

Track listing
 "DMV" – 3:08
 "Sign the Bill" – 2:08
 "It Won't Happen Again" – 4:10
 "Hail to the King" – 1:51
 "Weirdo" – 2:37
 "Truth Hits Everybody" (The Police cover) – 2:44
 "Felix" – 2:23
 "Noitall" – 2:20
 "I Detest" – 2:13
 "Puppet Show" – 3:20
 "Record Thieves" – 2:49
 "Power Bitch" – 4:04

References

No Use for a Name albums
1990 debut albums
New Red Archives albums